Charmes is a commune in the Vosges department in Grand Est in northeastern France. It is located on the river Moselle and the Canal de l'Est.

It was extensively destroyed both in the First and Second World Wars. A pleasant stop for mobile home owners and canal boats.

See also
Communes of the Vosges department
Battle of the Trouée de Charmes

References

External links

Official site

Communes of Vosges (department)
Duchy of Lorraine